Mary Clare Higgins is an American politician who was a six-term mayor of Northampton, Massachusetts, from 2000 to 2011. A Democrat, she was the second woman to hold the position. Higgins became the executive director of Community Action Pioneer Valley in September 2011.

Education and background
Higgins was born in Pittsburgh, Pennsylvania, and is one of six siblings. As a adolescent, she moved with her family to Brooklyn, New York, where her father was active in politics. She earned her bachelor's degree in 2003 through the University Without Walls (University of Massachusetts Amherst). Higgins worked in early childhood education.

Career
Higgins became involved in politics in the early 1990s, when she became a commissioner on the board of the Northampton Housing Authority. During the same period, the city drew national media attention for its percentage of lesbians among the population.

Higgins was elected as an at-large City Councilor in 1993 and held the office until 1999; she served as president of the council for the last two years.

Higgins was elected to her first term as mayor in November 1999, assuming office in January 2000. She was the city's first openly lesbian mayor. Higgins resigned in September 2011 to become executive director of Community Action Pioneer Valley.

During her tenure, she was able to secure affordable housing for residents who were at risk of losing their homes due to condo conversion. The city's capital improvement fund for infrastructure was greatly expanded and used for a new water filtration plant, a senior center, a new police station, and new public works facility.

She is a member of the Mayors Against Illegal Guns Coalition, an organization formed in 2006 and co-chaired by New York City mayor Michael Bloomberg and Boston mayor Thomas Menino.

Higgins was recognized for her contributions by U.S. House of Representatives in 2012. She campaigned for Barack Obama during 2012 as part of the bus tour "Mayors for Obama". She became a monthly columnist for the Daily Hampshire Gazette.

See also
List of LGBT politicians in the United States

References

External links
Office of the Mayor's homepage
Northampton Mayors
Mayors Against Illegal Guns homepage
Mary Clare Higgins, Massachusetts, 1993 · Out and Elected in the USA: 1974-2004 Ron Schlittler · OutHistory: It's About Time
 Mary Clare Higgins interviewed by Tegan Waring, 2014 November 16 | Smith College Finding Aids

21st-century American women politicians
American LGBT city council members
LGBT mayors of places in the United States
Living people
Massachusetts Democrats
Mayors of places in Massachusetts
Politicians from Brooklyn
Politicians from Northampton, Massachusetts
University of Massachusetts Amherst alumni
Women city councillors in Massachusetts
Women mayors of places in Massachusetts
Year of birth missing (living people)
21st-century American politicians